Acacia aneura var. fuliginea is a perennial tree which is native to Western Australia.

See also
 List of Acacia species

References

External links
 Flora of Australia Volume 11B (2001) figure 67.

aneura var. fuliginea
fuliginea
Endemic flora of Western Australia
Fabales of Australia
Acacias of Western Australia
Trees of Australia
Drought-tolerant trees
Taxa named by Leslie Pedley